Action Française (AF) is a French far-right monarchist political movement. The name was also given to a journal associated with the movement.

The movement and the journal were founded by Maurice Pujo and Henri Vaugeois in 1899, as a nationalist reaction against the intervention of left-wing intellectuals on behalf of Alfred Dreyfus. Charles Maurras quickly joined Action française and became its principal ideologist. Under the influence of Maurras, Action française became royalist, counter-revolutionary (objecting to the legacy of the French Revolution), anti-parliamentary and pro-decentralization, espousing corporatism, integralism and Catholicism.

Shortly after it was created, Action française tried to influence public opinion by turning its journal into a daily newspaper and by setting up other organizations. It was at its most prominent during the 1899–1914 period. In the inter-war period, the movement still enjoyed some prestige from support among conservative elites, but its popularity gradually declined as a result of the rise of fascism and of a rupture in its relations with the Catholic Church. During the Second World War, Action française supported the Vichy Regime and Marshal Philippe Pétain. After the fall of Vichy, its newspaper was banned and Maurras was sentenced to life imprisonment. The movement nevertheless continued in new publications and political associations, although with fading relevance as monarchism lost popularity, and French far-right movements shifted toward an emphasis on Catholic values and defense of classical French culture.  It is seen by some as one progenitor of the current National Rally political party.

Ideology
The ideology of Action française was dominated by the precepts of Charles Maurras, following his adherence and his conversion of the movement's founders to royalism. The movement supported a restoration of the House of Bourbon and, after the 1905 law on the separation of Church and State, the restoration of Roman Catholicism as the state religion, all as rallying points in distinction to the Third Republic of France which was considered corrupt and atheistic by many of its opponents.

The movement advocated decentralization (a "federal monarchy"), with the restoration of pre-Revolutionary liberties to the ancient provinces of France (replaced during the Revolution by the departmental system). It aimed to achieve a restoration by means of a coup d'état, probably involving a transitional authoritarian government.

Action française was not focused on denouncing one social or political group as the conspiratorial source of ills befalling France. Different groups of the French far-right had animuses against Jews, Huguenots (French Calvinists), and Freemasons. To these, Maurras added unspecific foreigners residing in France, who had been outside French law under the Ancien Régime, and to whom he invented a slur name derived from ancient Greek history: métèques. These four groups of "internal foreigners" Maurras called les quatre états confédérés and were all considered to be part of "Anti-France". He also opposed Marxism and the October Revolution, but antagonism against them did not have to be manufactured.

History

Founding and rise (1898–1914)
In 1899, Maurice Pujo and Henri Vaugeois left the nationalist mouvement Ligue de la Patrie française and established a new movement, called Action française, and a new journal, Revue de l'Action française. This was their nationalist reaction against the intervention of left-wing intellectuals on the behalf of Alfred Dreyfus.

Charles Maurras quickly joined Action française and became its principal ideologist. Under the influence of Maurras, Action française became monarchist, counter-revolutionary (objecting to the legacy of the French Revolution) and anti-democratic, and supported integralism and Catholicism. The Dreyfus affair gave some Catholics the impression that Catholicism is not compatible with democracy. Therefore, they regarded Action française as rampart of religion and the most fitting expression of the church doctrine regarding society.

In its early years, Action française tried to influence public opinion and to spread its ideas. For example, it created related organizations, such as student groups. The political organization of the movement, the Ligue d'Action Française, was launched in the spring of 1905, as was the Action Française Federation of Students, directed by Lucien Moreau.
L'Institut d'Action française was created in 1906 as an alternative institute for higher education. In 1908 the movement's periodical was turned to a daily newspaper, called simply Action française. Camelots du Roi, the movement's youth wing, was created in the same year to sell the newspaper in the streets. Its members also served as a paramilitary wing, providing security for meetings and engaging in street violence with political opponents. The newspaper's literary quality and polemical vigor attracted readers and made Maurras and the movement significant figures in French politics. By 1914, Action française was the best structured and the most vital nationalist movement in France.

First World War and aftermath (1914–1926)

During the First World War, Action française supported the prime minister Georges Clemenceau and the will to defeat the Germans. France's victory in the war, and the movement's anti-German intransigence on the peace terms resulted in a peak of success, prestige and influence in the inter-war period. For example, in 1917 it moved into new spacious offices on the rue Caumartin, near St. Lazare train station. However, in the French legislative elections of 16 November 1919 Bernard de Vésins, president of the Ligue d'Action française, was defeated in the first district of Paris.

Action française exploited the disquiet aroused on the right by the victory of the left-wing coalition in 1924 (Cartel des gauches) and the horror of communism, sending about thirty candidates to the French parliament. Well-known writers endorsed the movement, which advertised itself as the thinking man's party. Literary reviews, especially Revue universelle, spread the message of Action française. The polemics of the review, its personal attacks on leaders, and its systematic exploitation of scandals and crises helped detach some of the intellectuals from their allegiance to the republic and democracy. This agitation culminated in the 6 February 1934 crisis.

The successes shaped the ideology of Action française. It became more integrated into mainstream conservatism, stressing patriotism and Catholicism as opposed to monarchism.

Papal condemnation and decline
In spite of the movement's support for Roman Catholicism as a state religion and the fact that the vast majority of its members were practising Catholics (indeed, they included significant numbers of clergy), some Catholics regarded it with distrust.

Much of this was due to the influence of Maurras, an agnostic who advocated Catholicism as a factor of social cohesion and stability and a vital element of French tradition. This rather utilitarian view of religion disturbed many who otherwise agreed with him. Its influence on young Catholics was also considered unwholesome. Thus, on 29 December 1926, Pope Pius XI condemned Action française.

Several of Maurras's writings were placed on the Index Librorum Prohibitorum at the same time, on 9 January 1927, with Action française being the first newspaper ever placed on the Catholic Church's list of banned books. This was a devastating blow to the movement. On 8 March 1927, AF members were prohibited from receiving the sacraments. Many of its members left (two Catholics who were forced to look for a different path in politics and life were writers François Mauriac and Georges Bernanos); and it entered a period of decline.

In 1939, following the Spanish Civil War and a revival of anti-communism in the Catholic Church, Pope Pius XII decided to end the condemnation. Thereafter, Action française claimed that the condemnation had been declared for political purposes.

Interwar revival
Despite the 1926 Papal condemnation, Action française remained popular during the interwar period, being one of the most important far-right leagues, along with the Croix-de-Feu and others. As increasing numbers of people in France (as in Europe as a whole) turned to authoritarian political movements, many turned to Action française. It thus continued to recruit members from the new generations, such as Robert Brasillach (who would become a collaborationist), the novelist and former deputy and ambassador Pierre Benoist, Thierry Maulnier, and Lucien Rebatet. It was marginally represented for a time in the Chamber of Deputies, particularly by Léon Daudet, elected in the right-wing Chambre bleue horizon (1919–1924).

However, with the rise of fascism and the creation of seemingly fascist leagues, added to the 1926 Papal condemnation, the royalist movement was weakened by various dissidents: Georges Valois would create the fascist Faisceau, Louis Dimier would break away, while other members (Eugène Deloncle, Gabriel Jeantet, etc.) created the terrorist La Cagoule group.

The retired Admiral Antoine Schwerer became president of the league in 1930, succeeding Bernard de Vésins in difficult circumstances.
He was a talented orator.
At the December 1931 congress, "greeted by loud acclamation", he gave himself to a full presentation of "the general situation of France", external, financial, economic, interior and religious. He concluded with a passionate statement,

Antoine Schwerer was forced by illness to retire to Brittany in 1935.
He was succeeded as head of the league by François de Lassus.

John Gunther wrote that of the more than 100 daily newspapers in Paris, only L'Humanité and Action Française were honest. The group participated in the 6 February 1934 crisis, which led to the fall of the second Cartel des gauches and to the replacement of the centre-left Radical-Socialist Édouard Daladier by the centre-right Radical Gaston Doumergue. In foreign policy, Maurras and Bainville supported Pierre Laval's double alliance with Benito Mussolini's Fascist Italy and with the United Kingdom in the Stresa Front (1935) on one side, and with the Soviet Union on the other side, against the common enemy Nazi Germany. The Action française greeted Franco's appearance with delight, and supported the self-proclaimed Caudillo during the Spanish Civil War (1936–1939). But the extra-parliamentary agitation brought by the far-right leagues, including the AF, led Pierre Laval's government to outlaw militias and paramilitary leagues, leading to the dissolution of the AF on 13 February 1936 – the other leagues were dissolved only in June 1936 by the Popular Front.

Marshal Philippe Pétain's proclamation of the Vichy regime and of the Révolution nationale after the failure of the Battle of France was acclaimed by Maurras as a "divine surprise", and he rallied the collaborationist regime. Royalist members hoped that Pétain would restore the monarchy, and the headquarters of the movement were moved from Paris to Vichy. However, the AF members were split between supporting the counter-revolutionary regime and their nationalism: after 1942, and in particular in 1943, some members, such as Henri d'Astier de la Vigerie, Pierre Guillain de Bénouville or Honoré d'Estienne d'Orves joined the Resistance or escaped to join the Free French Forces. Others actively collaborated, while Maurras supported the Vichy government, but theoretically opposed Pétain's collaboration with the Germans. After the Liberation, he was condemned to life imprisonment in 1944, though he was reprieved in 1952. Action française was dissolved in 1944.

After World War II

Action française reformed itself in 1947, under the influence of Maurice Pujo, who created the newspaper  (AF) and the counter-revolutionary movement, "" ("National Restoration").

In 1971, a breakaway movement, the "" was formed by Bertrand Renouvin, Georges-Paul Wagner and others. It subsequently became the Nouvelle Action Royaliste (NAR), which supported the Orleanist heir (although in his 1968 reprinting of his study on the three French right-wing families, René Rémond still classified it in the legitimist movement because of its counter-revolutionary ideology). The movement called for the support of François Mitterrand in the 1981 presidential election, instead of supporting Jacques Chirac's "neo-Gaullism" movement (the Gaullists are classed by René Rémond as Bonapartists) or Valéry Giscard d'Estaing's "Orleanist" movement (because of his support of economic liberalism).

In the beginning of the 1980s, various AF figures, such as Georges-Paul Wagner or  joined the ranks of Jean-Marie Le Pen's National Front (FN). Until the 1999 breakaway of the National Republican Movement (MNR) led by Bruno Mégret, Jean-Marie Le Pen's success was partly explained by his unification of the various far right families (such as traditionalist Catholics, royalists, neofascists, etc.) which share few ideals apart from a distrust of liberal democracy and a staunch anti-communism.

In the 1990s, the leader of the movement was Pierre Pujo (Maurice Pujo's son), who died in Paris on 10 November 2007. The student movement, called , has approximately 15 local delegations (in places such as Paris, Normandy, Rennes, Bordeaux, and Forez) and a newspaper, . Its president is Oliver Perceval.

Action française today

Action française has 3,000 adherents in 2018, grew from 18% in 2017 and 53% between 2013 and 2018. The movement stands for a traditional, hereditary, anti-parliamentary and decentralized monarchy and is strongly anti-European Union. The organization sees itself as a thinktank and not a political party. The movement presents ideas to answer to all issues regarding national interest such as sovereignty, ecology, and globalization.

Political line
Politically, Action Française remains a royalist, nationalist, and counter-revolutionary movement. Its objective is to restore "a sovereign state fully exercising its regalian functions" in France through the establishment of a decentralized and representative monarchy that guarantees the "just exercise of lasting power". Politically, the movement advocates the establishment of a monarchy "adapted to our times that is not a return to an ancient order but a serious response to current issues" with the Orleans family at its head. The movement also supports the idea of a "royalist compromise around the monarchy".
 AF is opposed to the European Union, which it describes as unitary and utopian in spirit. Thus, in its words, "the EU would have put in place a centralizing federalist system", a transfer of sovereignty of nations to European bodies.
Refusing the "party system", Action Française puts the salvation of the nation above all individual and partisan interests, in accordance with its slogan "All that is national is ours". As the heir of Charles Maurras's ideas, Action Française remains unparliamentary.
 Arguing that the family is the foundation of the nation and that there can only be marriage between one man and one woman, AF participated in 2012 and 2013 in La Manif pour tous and the Printemps français against the legalization of same-sex marriage, adoption of children by homosexuals, surrogate motherhood, and medically-assisted procreation.

Organization
The official entity of the organisation is called "", even if the forbidden name is used in the communication of the movement. It publishes a magazine called Le bien commun.

The AF is organized in region federations, in which stand local school, student, and workers sections. Those sections circulate their ideas and debate in circles. The most known is the Parisian literary circle, "Cercle de Flore", which invites French conservatory and right wing authors intelligentsia. Most of the circles are internal and are designed to train young members to the ideas of the movement. This is the case of the Parisian Charles Maurras circle which gathers the Parisian students.

Following its tradition, the movement edits a newspaper which is sold by its supporters in the street. This allows the young adherents to learn how to debate and publicly defend their ideas. Each year, on the second Sunday of May, a traditional cortege in honour of Joan of Arc is organized.

During and after the manifestations "la manif pour tous" (2013–2014) opposing the Same-sex marriage in France, Action Française created "le printemps français", an activist submovement, and grew a lot recruiting a young generation.

The students of the movement have organized a summer university called "camp Maxime-Real del Sarte" since 1953, gathering approximately 200 activists.

Action française is active on the Internet and is followed by 11,000 accounts on Twitter and 24,000 people on Facebook. The movement uses YouTube videos and memes to spread its ideas.

Judgment of political scientists

Classification as fascist
In 1965, the German historian Ernst Nolte claimed that Action française was fascist. He considered Action française to be the first fascist party.

Certain present-day scholars disagree with Nolte's view. For example, in 1999, the British historian Richard Thurlow claimed that "his [Nolte's] linking of Action française to the fascist tradition was misleading". Later, René Rémond and Stanley G. Payne described the differences between Action française and Italian fascism.

Influence on national syndicalism and fascism
In the books Neither Right nor Left and The Birth of Fascist Ideology, Zeev Sternhell claimed that Action française influenced national syndicalism and, consequently, fascism.
According to Sternhell, national syndicalism was formed by the combination between the integral nationalism of Action française and the revolutionary syndicalism of Georges Sorel. National syndicalism spread to Italy, and was later a part of the doctrine of Italian fascist movement.
In France, national syndicalism influenced the non-conformists of the 1930s. Based on the views of the non-conformists themselves, Sternhell argued that the non-conformists were actually a French form of fascism.

René Rémond's classification
Although it supported the Orléanist branch, according to historian René Rémond's categorization of French right-wing families, it would be closer to the legitimist branch, characterized by a complete rejection of all changes to France since the 1789 French Revolution. According to Rémond, supporters of the Orléanist branch tended to favour economic liberalism.

See also

Anti-parliamentarism
French Third Republic (1870–1940)
Hussards (literary movement), a movement created in the 1950s in reaction against existentialism and close to the AF
Monarchism
Nouvelle Action Royaliste

References

Further reading
 

 
Weber, Eugen Action Française; Royalism And Reaction In Twentieth-Century France, Stanford, California, Stanford University Press, 1962.
Nolte, Ernst The Three Faces Of Fascism: Action Française, Italian Fascism, National Socialism, translated from the German by Leila Vennewitz, London: Weidenfeld and Nicolson, 1965.

External links
  Official website of Action Française

 
Anti-Protestantism
Anti-Masonry
Dreyfus affair
Catholicism and far-right politics
Far-right political parties in France
Far-right politics in France
Political magazines published in France
Magazines established in 1908
Organizations that oppose LGBT rights
Orléanist parties
History of Catholicism in France
French Integralism
Political parties of the French Third Republic
1899 establishments in France
Anti-German sentiment in Europe
Magazines published in Paris
National syndicalism
Organizations established in 1899
Antisemitism in France
Anti-communist organizations
National conservative parties